Alteribacillus persepolensis is a Gram-positive and moderately halophilic bacterium from the genus of Alteribacillus which has been isolated from the brine of the Howz Soltan Lake in Iran.

References

External links

Type strain of Alteribacillus persepolensis at BacDive -  the Bacterial Diversity Metadatabase

Bacillaceae
Bacteria described in 2009